"Positive Reaction" is a pop song written and produced by Stock Aitken Waterman for Mandy Smith's debut studio album Mandy (1988). The song was released in October 1987 as the album's second single. The song failed to chart in the UK. It was however successful around Europe.

"Positive Reaction" is an upbeat and catchy pop song with a strong dance beat and synth-driven melody. The lyrics are about a woman who is feeling empowered and positive after a breakup, and are delivered with a confident and enthusiastic vocal performance from Smith.

Critical reception
In review of 31 October 1987 Richard James of Number One called  "Positive Reaction" "typical high energy crap". He wrote: "After Stock Aitken and Waterman did a classic like Sinitta's "Toy Boy", this in comparison sounds like they found it lying in a box said 'oi Mandy, sing that one luv'. All girls like this have similar voices."

Formats and track listings
7" single
 "Positive Reaction" - 3:27
 "Positive Reaction" (A Man Das Mix - Instrumental) - 3:49
12" single
 "Positive Reaction" (Our Mandy's Extended Mix) - 6:24
 "Positive Reaction" (A Man Das Mix - Instrumental) - 3:49
12" remix
 "Positive Reaction" (Miami Mix) - 6:58
 "Positive Reaction" (A Man Das Mix - Instrumental) - 3:49

Charts

References

1987 singles
Songs written by Pete Waterman
Songs written by Mike Stock (musician)
Songs written by Matt Aitken